Fernando Valenzuela Anguamea (born November 1, 1960) is a Mexican former professional baseball pitcher. While he played for six MLB teams, his longest tenure was with the Los Angeles Dodgers. Valenzuela batted and threw left-handed. His career highlights include a win-loss record of 173–153, with an earned run average (ERA) of 3.54. His 41.5 career wins above replacement (according to Baseball-Reference) is the highest of any Mexican-born MLB player. Valenzuela had an unorthodox windup and was one of a small number of pitchers who threw a screwball regularly. Never a particularly hard thrower, the Dodgers felt he needed another pitch; he was taught the screwball in 1979 by teammate Bobby Castillo.

Valenzuela was signed by the Dodgers on July 6, 1979, and made his debut late in the  season. In , in what came to be called "Fernandomania," Valenzuela rose from relative obscurity to achieve stardom. He won his first eight starts (five of them shutouts). Valenzuela finished with a record of 13–7 and had a 2.48 ERA; the season was shortened by a player's strike. He became the first, and only player to win both Cy Young and Rookie of the Year awards in the same season.

Valenzuela was also one of the better hitting pitchers of his era. He had ten career home runs and was occasionally used by Los Angeles Dodgers manager Tommy Lasorda as a pinch-hitter. However, for the remainder of Valenzuela's Dodgers career, his pitching efforts were rendered less effective, largely due to nagging shoulder problems. He was on the Dodgers’ 1988 World Series championship team, but he did not play that postseason because of his ailing shoulder. On June 29, 1990, Valenzuela threw his only MLB no-hitter, pitching at Dodger Stadium against the St. Louis Cardinals, a 6–0 victory. Despite having recently shown flashes of his former self, he was unceremoniously released by the Dodgers just prior to the  season. The remainder of his big league career was spent with the California Angels, Baltimore Orioles, Philadelphia Phillies, San Diego Padres, and St. Louis Cardinals.

Valenzuela retired from baseball after the 1997 season. In 2003, he returned to the Dodgers as a broadcaster. In 2015, he became a naturalized American citizen.

Early life 
Fernando Valenzuela, the youngest of twelve children, was born in Etchohuaquila, a small town within the municipality of Navojoa in the state of Sonora, Mexico. His birth date is officially listed as November 1, 1960, but during his rookie season in 1981, several commentators questioned his age, guessing him to be significantly older than 20. His parents, Avelino and María, were poor farmers who worked the land with the help of their children, and are of Mayo indigenous ancestry.

Playing career

Early career in Mexico
In 1977, Valenzuela began his professional baseball career when he signed with the Mayos de Navojoa. A year later, he was sent to the Guanajuato Tuzos of the Mexican Central League, posting a 5–6 win–loss record with a 2.23 earned run average (ERA). The following year, the Mexican Central League was absorbed into the expanded Mexican League, automatically elevating then 18-year-old Valenzuela to the Triple-A level. Pitching for the Leones de Yucatán that year, Valenzuela went 10–12 with a 2.49 ERA and 141 strikeouts.

A number of MLB teams scouted Valenzuela during this time. Los Angeles Dodgers scout Mike Brito had gone to a game in Mexico to evaluate a shortstop named Ali Uscanga. Valenzuela threw three balls to Uscanga to fall behind in the count and then threw three straight strikes to strike out the batter. Brito said later that at that point, he "forgot all about the shortstop". The Dodgers finally gambled on the young lefty, buying out his Liga contract on July 6, 1979, for $120,000.

Move to the Los Angeles Dodgers organization 
After acquiring Valenzuela in the summer of 1979, the Dodgers assigned him to the Lodi Dodgers of the High-A level California League where he posted a 1–2 record and a 1.13 earned run average (ERA) in limited action. The Dodgers felt that Valenzuela needed to learn to throw an off-speed pitch, so they had Dodgers pitcher Bobby Castillo teach him to throw the screwball before the 1980 season. In 1980 Valenzuela was promoted to the Double-A level San Antonio Dodgers. There Valenzuela led the Texas League with 162 strikeouts, finishing the season with a 13–9 win–loss record and a 3.10 ERA.

Valenzuela was called up to the Los Angeles Dodgers bullpen in September 1980. In the last month of the season, Valenzuela helped the Dodgers to a tie with the Houston Astros for the National League Western Division lead, pitching 17 scoreless innings of relief over the course of ten games, during which he earned two wins and a save. However, the Dodgers then lost a one-game playoff—and thus, the division championship—to the Astros.

"Fernandomania" 
The following season, Valenzuela was named the Opening Day starter as a rookie after Jerry Reuss was injured 24 hours before his scheduled start, and Burt Hooton was not ready to fill in. Valenzuela shut out the Houston Astros 2–0. He started the season 8–0 with five shutouts and an ERA of 0.50. In addition to his dominance on the mound, Valenzuela's unusual and flamboyant pitching motion—including a glance skyward at the apex of each wind-up—drew attention of its own. It was a habit he claims to have developed spontaneously, although not until joining the Dodgers.

An instant media icon, Valenzuela drew large crowds from Los Angeles' Latino community every time he pitched and triggered high demand across the country for his rookie 1981 Topps and Fleer baseball cards. The craze surrounding Valenzuela came to be known as "Fernandomania". During his warm-up routine at Dodger Stadium, the PA system would play ABBA's 1976 hit song Fernando. He became the first player to win the Rookie of the Year Award and the Cy Young Award in the same season. He was also the first rookie to lead the National League in strikeouts. The Dodgers won the World Series that season.

Prior to the 1982 season, Valenzuela became the first player to be awarded a $1 million salary in arbitration (equivalent to $ million in ).

Valenzuela was less dominant after the 1981 player strike wiped out the middle third of the season, but the left-hander still finished with a 13–7 record and a 2.48 ERA. He led all pitchers in complete games (11), shutouts (8), innings pitched (192.1), and strikeouts (180). In the NL West Division Series against the Houston Astros, Valenzuela became the youngest pitcher to start the first game of any postseason series and later pitched a complete game in Game Three of the World Series against the New York Yankees. In total, he went 3–1 in the postseason as he helped the Dodgers to their first world championship since 1965.

In addition to his skills on the mound, Valenzuela also displayed much better offensive skills than most pitchers. During his rookie season, Valenzuela batted .250 and struck out just 9 times in 64 at-bats, and he was the recipient of the National League's Silver Slugger Award for pitchers.

"El Toro" 
Following his outstanding debut, Valenzuela, nicknamed "El Toro" (the Bull) by fans, settled down into a number of years as a workhorse starter and one of the league's best pitchers.

Prior to the 1986 season, he signed a contract worth $5.5 million over three years (equivalent to $ million in ), then the wealthiest contract for a pitcher in baseball history. His annual average salary of $1,833,333 and 1988 salary of $2.05 million (equivalent to $ million in ) also both set records for a pitcher.

He had one of his best seasons in 1986, when he finished 21–11 with a 3.14 ERA and led the league in wins, complete games and innings pitched. He lost a narrow vote for the 1986 National League Cy Young Award to the Astros' Mike Scott.

At the 1986 All-Star Game, Valenzuela made history by striking out five consecutive American League batters, tying a record set by fellow left-handed screwballer Carl Hubbell in the 1934 contest.

In 1987 his performance declined; he earned a 14–14 win–loss record with a 3.98 ERA. In 1988, a year in which the Dodgers won the World Series, he won just five games and missed much of the season, despite not being on the postseason roster, he still earned a second World Series ring. He improved slightly in 1989 and went 10–13; he posted a 13–13 record in 1990. He had one last great moment on June 29, 1990, when he threw a 6–0 no-hitter against the St. Louis Cardinals just hours after the Oakland Athletics' Dave Stewart had thrown one against the Toronto Blue Jays. According to teammate Mike Scioscia, Fernando and many Dodger players watched Stewart, who was a former Dodgers player, throw the no-hitter on TV. Afterward, before his game, Fernando said to his teammates, "You just saw a no-hitter on TV. Now you will see one in person."

Early in his major league career, Valenzuela had trouble communicating with his catchers because he spoke very little English. Mike Scioscia, after being called up as a rookie, made the effort to learn Spanish and eventually became Valenzuela's "personal catcher" with the Dodgers before becoming the full-time catcher.

Post-Dodgers career 

After pitching ineffectively in spring training in 1991, Valenzuela was released by the Dodgers. At the time of Valenzuela's release, several Dodgers leaders, including Tommy Lasorda, Fred Claire, and Peter O'Malley, praised Valenzuela for creating exciting memories over several seasons and they indicated that it was a difficult decision to release him.

An abortive attempt at a comeback with the California Angels failed later that summer. Valenzuela signed with the Detroit Tigers in the spring of 1992, but he never played for the team, and was out of the Majors in 1992, with his contract being purchased by Jalisco of the Mexican League that summer. He pitched and played some first base when he wasn't on the mound before making another brief comeback in 1993 with the Baltimore Orioles.

Jumping between the big leagues and Mexico for the next few seasons, he put together one more solid big-league season in 1996 for the San Diego Padres, going 13–8 with a 3.62 ERA. He retired a year later with a final record of 173–153 and a 3.54 ERA as a member of the St. Louis Cardinals.

The Los Angeles Dodgers invited him to spring training in 1999, but he declined the offer.

On June 29, 2004, Valenzuela announced he would return to the mound in the Liga Mexicana del Pacífico (the Mexican Pacific Coast League) to play for Los Aguilas de Mexicali in October; he was nearly 44 years old at the time. He pitched again in the Mexican winter league during the 2005–06 season. On December 20, 2006, in Mexicali, BC, Mexico, Fernando Valenzuela was the starting pitcher for Los Aguilas de Mexicali in the last professional game of his career.

Hitting 
Valenzuela was considered an atypically good hitter for a pitcher. His best year at the plate was 1990—his last year with the Dodgers—when he hit .304 with five doubles, one home run, and 11 RBI in 69 at-bats. That gave him a 101 OPS+, meaning Valenzuela ranked just above average among all National League hitters that year, including non-pitchers. With 187 hits in 936 career at-bats—roughly two full seasons worth of at-bats for a full-time position player—his career batting average was .200, with 10 home runs, 26 doubles, and 84 RBI. Valenzuela was even used on occasion as a pinch-hitter, batting .368 (7-for-19) in such situations. Twice while with the Dodgers, Valenzuela was called upon to play outfield and first base in marathon extra-inning games in which he did not pitch. He won the Silver Slugger award for pitchers in 1981 and 1983.

After retirement 

In 2003, Valenzuela returned to the Dodgers organization as the Spanish-language radio color commentator for National League West games, joining Jaime Jarrín and Pepe Yñiguez in the Spanish-language booth. In 2015, he was switched to the color commentator job on the Spanish-language feed of SportsNet LA.

Valenzuela also served on the coaching staff of Team Mexico during the 2006 World Baseball Classic, 2009 World Baseball Classic, 2013 World Baseball Classic, and 2017 World Baseball Classic.

He purchased the Mexican League team Tigres de Quintana Roo in 2017.

Legacy 

Valenzuela was inducted into the Hispanic Heritage Baseball Museum Hall of Fame on August 23, 2003, in a pregame on the field ceremony at Dodger Stadium. In 2005, he was named one of three starting pitchers on MLB's Latino Legends Team. In 2013, he was enshrined into the Caribbean Baseball Hall of Fame. Valenzuela was inducted into the Baseball Reliquary's Shrine of the Eternals in 2006.

As a show of respect, the Dodgers have unofficially kept Valenzuela's jersey number 34 out of circulation and they named him as part of the initial class of "Legends of Dodger Baseball" in 2019.

On October 26, 2010, ESPN broadcast a documentary commemorating Valenzuela's arrival with the Dodgers titled Fernando Nation as part of their 30 for 30 documentary series.

On October 25, 2017, Valenzuela threw the first pitch at Game 2 of the 2017 World Series at Dodger Stadium, introduced by recently retired announcer Vin Scully, and joined by Steve Yeager.

The Mexican Baseball League commemorated Valenzuela's legacy on July 6, 2019 by retiring his jersey number 34 from the entire league.

The Dodgers announced on February 4, 2023, that they will induct Valenzuela to the Dodgers Ring of Honor during "Fernandomania" weekend on August 11-13, 2023. In addition, his number 34 will be officially retired by the team.

Personal life 
In 1981, Valenzuela married Linda Burgos, a schoolteacher from Mexico. Early in his career, Valenzuela and his family spent offseasons between the Mexican cities of Etchohuaquila and Mérida. The couple has four children. One of Valenzuela's sons, Fernando, Jr., played in the San Diego Padres and Chicago White Sox organizations as a first baseman. Since 2006, Fernando Jr. has played minor league baseball in Mexico or in independent leagues.

Valenzuela became a U.S. citizen on July 22, 2015, at a ceremony in downtown Los Angeles. He has participated in two Tournament of Roses Parades—in 1983 aboard the float from the Government of Mexico and in 2008 aboard the Los Angeles Dodgers' float. In 1981, Valenzuela participated in the East Los Angeles Christmas Parade as Grand Marshal.

See also

 List of Los Angeles Dodgers no-hitters
 List of Major League Baseball annual shutout leaders
 List of Major League Baseball career bases on balls allowed leaders
 List of Major League Baseball career strikeout leaders
 List of Major League Baseball career wild pitches leaders
 List of Major League Baseball players from Mexico
 List of members of the Mexican Professional Baseball Hall of Fame
 Los Angeles Dodgers award winners and league leaders

References 

Sources

External links

Fernando Valenzuela at Baseball Almanac
Fernando Valenzuela at Baseballbiography.com

1960 births
Living people
Águilas de Mexicali players
Baltimore Orioles players
Baseball players from Sonora
Bowie Baysox players
California Angels players
Charros de Jalisco players
Cy Young Award winners
Edmonton Trappers players
Gold Glove Award winners
Leones de Yucatán players
Lodi Dodgers players
Los Angeles Dodgers announcers
Los Angeles Dodgers players
Major League Baseball broadcasters
Major League Baseball pitchers
Major League Baseball players from Mexico
Mayos de Navojoa players
Mexican Baseball Hall of Fame inductees
Mexican emigrants to the United States
Mexican expatriate baseball players in Canada
Mexican expatriate baseball players in the United States
Mexican League baseball pitchers
Mexican people of indigenous peoples descent
Midland Angels players
National League All-Stars
National League strikeout champions
National League wins champions
Naturalized citizens of the United States
Palm Springs Angels players
People from Navojoa Municipality
Philadelphia Phillies players
Rochester Red Wings players
San Antonio Dodgers players
San Diego Padres players
Screwball pitchers
Silver Slugger Award winners
St. Louis Cardinals players
Tuzos de Guanajuato players
Mayo people